Tazlău is a commune in Neamț County, Western Moldavia, Romania. It is composed of a single village, also named Tazlău.

Tazlău Monastery is located in the village.

Natives
 I. I. Mironescu

References

Communes in Neamț County
Localities in Western Moldavia